This is a list of the municipalities in the state of Minas Gerais (MG), located in the Southeast Region of Brazil. Minas Gerais is divided into 853 municipalities, which are grouped into 66 microregions, which are grouped into 12 mesoregions.

See also
Geography of Brazil
List of cities in Brazil

 01
Minas Gerais